The Metropolitan Tabernacle is a large independent Reformed Baptist church in the Elephant and Castle in London. It was the largest non-conformist church of its day in 1861. The Tabernacle Fellowship have been worshipping together since 1650. Its first pastor was William Rider; other notable pastors and preachers include Benjamin Keach, John Gill, John Rippon and C. H. Spurgeon. The Tabernacle still worships and holds to its Biblical foundations and principles under its present pastor, Peter Masters.

History
The Tabernacle fellowship dates back to 1650, when the English Parliament banned independent Christian organisations from meeting together. This congregation braved persecution until 1688, when the Baptists were once again allowed to worship in freedom. At this point, the group built their first chapel, in Horsleydown, Southwark, an area of London immediately south of Tower Bridge.

In 1720, John Gill became pastor and served for 51 years. In 1771, John Rippon became pastor and served for 63 years. During these times, the church experienced growth and became one of the largest congregations in the country. Afterwards decline set in and by 1850 the congregation was small.

In 1854, Charles Haddon Spurgeon started serving at the Tabernacle at the age of 20. The church at the beginning of Spurgeon's pastorate was situated at New Park Street Chapel, but this soon became so full that services had to be held in hired halls such as the Surrey Gardens Music Hall.

During Spurgeon's ministry, it was decided that the church should move permanently to larger premises. The location chosen was the Elephant and Castle, a prominent location near the River Thames in South London, partly because it was thought to be the site of the burning of the Southwark Martyrs. The building with a 6,000-seat auditorium, designed by William Willmer Pocock, was finished in 1861 and dedicated on March 18. In 1881, the church had 5,500 members.

Spurgeon also founded a college for preachers (now Spurgeon's College) and church workers and orphanages for girls and boys, and wrote many Christian books which are still in print today.

In 1887, the church left the Baptist Union because of the widening influence of theological liberalism within the union. Spurgeon was adamant that the church would not "downgrade" the faith as he believed other baptist churches were doing.

At the end of 1891, membership was given as 5,311. Spurgeon served for 38 years and died in 1892.

The original building was burned down in 1898, leaving just the front portico and basement intact, before the rebuilt church was destroyed again in 1941 during the German bombing of London in World War II. Once again, the portico and basement survived and in 1957 the Tabernacle was rebuilt to a new but much smaller design accommodating surviving original features.

The war led to the Tabernacle fellowship being greatly diminished as few members of the old congregation were able to return to heavily blitzed central London. It rejoined the Baptist Union in 1955. By 1970 the congregation had fallen to the point where it occupied only a few pews. It left the Baptist Union again on 22 February 1971, just after Peter Masters became the pastor, over the same issues as under Spurgeon in 1887. Numbers greatly increased and this gave rise to the full church and galleries of today, together with numerous professions of faith. It hosts an annual school of theology, runs a part-time seminary for pastors, has five Sunday schools, and provides free video and audio downloads, along with live-streaming of services. The current assistant pastor at the Tabernacle is Ibrahim Ag Mohamed, originally of Mali.

Church basic policies
The Metropolitan Tabernacle is an independent reformed Baptist church. The following seven points show the key biblical policies followed, laid down by forebears, such as C. H. Spurgeon.
 Doctrines of grace, commonly called 'Calvinistic'.
 Free offer of the Gospel
 Traditional worship
 Working church
 Biblical separation
 The prayer meeting
 Wider ministries.

Pastors
 William Rider, c. 1653–c. 65 (12 years)
 Benjamin Keach, 1668–1704 (36 years)
 Benjamin Stinton, 1704–18 (14 years)
 John Gill, 1720–71 (51 years)
 John Rippon, 1773–1836 (63 years)
 Joseph Angus, 1837–39 (2 years)
 James Smith, 1841–50 (8 ½ years)
 William Walters, 1851–53 (2 years)
 Charles Spurgeon, 1854–92 (38 years)
 Arthur Tappan Pierson, 1891–93 (pulpit supply only, not installed as a Pastor – 2 years)
 Thomas Spurgeon, 1893–1908 (15 years)
 Archibald G. Brown, 1908–11 (3 years)
 Amzi Dixon, 1911–19 (8 years)
 Harry Tydeman Chilvers, 1919–35 (15 ½ years)
 W Graham Scroggie, 1938–43 (5 years)
 W G Channon, 1944–49 (5 years)
 Gerald B Griffiths, 1951–54 (3 years)
 Eric W Hayden, 1956–62 (6 years)
 Dennis Pascoe, 1963–69 (6 years)
 Peter Masters, 1970–present.

See also
List of the largest evangelical churches
List of the largest evangelical church auditoriums
Worship service (evangelicalism)

References

Bibliography
 .

External links
 
 History of the Metropolitan Tabernacle, official website 

Greek Revival church buildings in the United Kingdom
Churches completed in 1861
19th-century Baptist churches
Baptist churches in London
Churches in the London Borough of Southwark
1650 establishments in England
Religious organizations established in the 1650s
17th-century Protestant churches
19th-century churches in the United Kingdom